The National Museum of Tanzania is a consortium of five Tanzanian museums whose purpose is to preserve and show exhibits about the history and natural environment of Tanzania. The consortium developed from the National Museum of Dar es Salaam, established in 1934 by Tanganyika governor Harold MacMichael. Four more museums later joined the consortium, namely the Village Museum in Dar es Salaam, the National History Museum and the Arusha Declaration Museum in Arusha, and the Mwalimu Julius K. Nyerere Memorial Museum in Butiama.

Dar es Salaam National Museum
The Dar es Salaam National Museum is located in Shabban Robert Street, next to the botanical gardens in Kivukoni ward in Ilala District. Established in 1934 and open to the public since 1940, it was originally a memorial museum dedicated to King George V; one of the cars of the King is still on display. The museum was expanded in 1963, with the addition of a second building. It is now dedicated to the history of Tanzania. Its most famous exhibits include some bones of Paranthropus boisei that were among the findings of Louis Leakey at Olduvai. The museum also has a large section dedicated to the Shirazi city-state of Kilwa. More historical miscellaneous material is related to the German and British rule, and ancient Chinese pottery. The museum also has ethnographic collections on Tanzanian cultures.

Village Museum

The Kijiji cha Makumbusho, or Village Museum, established in 1967, is an open-air ethnographical museum located in the outskirts of Dar es Salaam, on the road to Mwenge and Bagamoyo. It showcases traditional huts from 16 different Tanzanian ethnic groups. There are also examples of traditional cultivations, and traditional music and dance shows are held daily.

National Natural History Museum
The National Natural History Museum in Arusha, open since 1987, is located in Arusha, in Boma Road. It has two permanent exhibits, respectively on human evolution and entomology.

Arusha Declaration Museum
The Arusha Declaration Museum, open since 1977, is located in Arusha, in Kaloleni Road. It displays documents on the colonial history of Tanzania, the fight for independence, and the Arusha Declaration where the first Tanzanian president Julius Nyerere outlined his political vision.

Nyerere Museum
The Mwalimu Julius K. Nyerere Memorial Museum, or Nyerere Museum for short, was established in the year 1999. It is located in Butiama, where Tanzania's first president Julius Nyerere was born and was buried. The museum display items related to Nyerere's personal and political life.

See also  
 List of museums in Tanzania

External links 
 Presentation of the National Museum of Tanzania by Dutch commercial organization momaa.org

Footnotes 

Museums in Tanzania
Buildings and structures in Dar es Salaam
Buildings and structures in Arusha
Culture in Dar es Salaam
Tourist attractions in the Arusha Region
Butiama
Tourist attractions in Dar es Salaam
Buildings and structures in the Mara Region
Tourist attractions in the Mara Region